Ratto is a surname. Notable people with the surname include:

Daniele Ratto (born 1989), Italian cyclist
Rossella Ratto (born 1993), Italian cyclist
Ray Ratto, American sportswriter

See also
Vilho Rättö (1913 - 2002), Finnish Knight of the Mannerheim Cross, driver and industrial worker